Urano means Uranus in Italian, Portuguese, Spanish, Galician, and Esperanto.
urano- may refer to:

uranium, chemistry
of the heavens, astronomy

Urano may refer to:

Monte Urano, a comune (municipality) in the Province of Ascoli Piceno in the Italian region Marche
Uranos (comics),  a fictional character, a member of the Eternals, a race in the Marvel Comics universe

Urano is also an uncommon Japanese family name. About 0.01% of Japanese have this family name. People with this name include:
, Japanese mangaka
Chiyuki Urano, Japanese classical baritone and bass
Hiroshi Urano (born 1989), Japanese baseball pitcher
, Japanese singer and tarento
, Japanese shogi player
, Japanese professional wrestler 
, Japanese Wrestler and Judoka

See also
Uranus (disambiguation)

Japanese-language surnames